Geritola goodii, the Good's epitola, is a butterfly in the family Lycaenidae. It is found in eastern Nigeria, Cameroon, Gabon, the Republic of the Congo, the Central African Republic, the Democratic Republic of the Congo, Uganda and north-western Tanzania. The habitat consists of forests.

References

Butterflies described in 1890
Poritiinae
Butterflies of Africa